is a private boys' senior high school, affiliated with Keio University, in Shiki, Saitama Prefecture.

Overview 
Keio Agricultural Senior High School was established in 1948, and in 1957 Keio Shiki was established on that school's property, replacing it.  there are about 750 students.

Notable alumni

Politicians
Ichiro Aisawa
Hisayasu Nagata
Masamune Wada
Sōichi Aikawa

Other
Hiroyuki Goto, Game designer
Hideyuki Okano, Dean of Keio University School of Medicine
Yūjirō Ishihara, Actor and Singer
Tsuyoshi Murata, Rugby union player
Daiki Sasaki, racing driver
Tetsuo Sakurai, Bassist

See also
Keio University

References

External links
 Keio Shiki Senior High School 
 "School life at Keio Shiki Senior High School" (English)

Keio University
Education in Saitama Prefecture
High schools in Saitama Prefecture
Boys' schools in Japan
Educational institutions established in 1948
1948 establishments in Japan